Chersonesos A is an early Medieval Black Sea shipwreck located in suboxic waters off the coast of Crimean peninsula. The ship is believed to be a Byzantine trading vessel.

See also
Sinop D
Robert Ballard

References

Ancient Black Sea shipwrecks
Maritime archaeology
Byzantine ships